Valdur Himbek (31 July 1925 Tallinn – 4 April 1991 Tallinn) was an Estonian film director and actor.

In 1949 he graduated from Estonian State Theatre Institute. From 1950 to 1955 he was expelled to a prison camp in Magadan Oblast. From 1955 to 1991 (with pauses) he was a film director at Estonian Television, and from 1971 to 1973 in Tallinnfilm. Besides his directorial work he played several supporting roles in films.

Filmography
 1965 "Külmale maale" (with Ants Kivirähk)
 1966 "Võlg" (Eesti Telefilm)
 1968 "Katused ja korstnad" (Eesti Telefilm)
 1971 "Inspiratsioon" (Tallinnfilm)
 1971 "Tuli öös" (Tallinnfilm)

References

1925 births
1991 deaths
Estonian film directors
Estonian male stage actors
Estonian male film actors
20th-century Estonian male actors
Gulag detainees
Prisoners and detainees of the Soviet Union
Male actors from Tallinn
People from Tallinn